Michael Beck may refer to:

Michael Beck (born 1949), American actor
Michael "Michi" Beck (born 1967), German singer
Mikkel Beck (born 1973), Danish football player